St. Paul's Bay is a town in the Northern Region of Malta, sixteen kilometres northwest of the capital Valletta. Saint Paul's Bay is the largest town in the Northern Region and the seat of the Northern Regional Committee.

Its name refers to the shipwreck of Saint Paul as documented in the Acts of the Apostles on St. Paul's Islands near St Paul's Bay, on his voyage from Caesarea to Rome, which laid the foundations of Christianity on the island.

Burmarrad, Wardija, Qawra, Buġibba, Xemxija, and San Martin, as well as parts of Bidnija and Mistra, form part of St. Paul's Bay Local Council.

The population in 2018 was 23,112. This goes up to about 60,000 between June and September with Maltese residents and tourists lodging in hotels, especially in Buġibba and Qawra.Heading north is Mistra Bay, its headland and St Paul's Island. Going west and crossing the island towards Ġnejna Bay and Golden Bay is the scenic Wardija Ridge.

History

Archaeological remains have been found in the limits of St. Paul's Bay, which go back to around 4000 BC. Among the remains there are the megalithic temples of Buġibba and Xemxija. In addition, Cart Ruts were found on the Wardija Ridge at Busewdien, while Punic tombs and other Bronze Age remains were also found. During the Roman period, St. Paul's Bay became an important harbour. Remains of a Roman road, baths and beehives, have been found at Xemxija, while Roman anchors were found on the seabed.

By the late Middle Ages, St. Paul's Bay was abandoned since the area was unsafe due to corsair raids. The local militia maintained several watch posts in the area. One of these, known as Ta' Tabibu farmhouse, still survives today and is considered to be the oldest building in St. Paul's Bay. A building of a church was also noted at the arrival of the Order of St John in 1530.

A number of fortifications were built in the area during the rule of the Order of Saint John. The first of these was the Wignacourt Tower, built in 1610, which is now the oldest surviving watchtower in Malta. Qawra Tower was built by Grand Master Lascaris in 1638. In 1715, batteries were built around these two towers, while two batteries and a redoubt were built in other parts of the St. Paul's Bay coastline. Of these, only Arrias Battery survives today, since Dellia Battery and Perellos Redoubt were demolished in the 20th century.

The bay was one of the landing places during the French invasion of Malta in June 1798. After the Maltese uprising against the French, St. Paul's Bay became the main harbour of Malta since the Grand Harbour and Marsamxett were still under French control.

In the 19th century, several villas were built in St. Paul's Bay. These were requisitioned by the British military in World War II and the bay became a rest camp. After the Italian armistice of 1943, 76 ships of the Regia Marina were anchored at St. Paul's Bay after surrendering to the British.

After the war, the area began to be further developed. Today, St. Paul's Bay, Qawra, Buġibba, Xemxija and Burmarrad form a large cluster of buildings. The area is a popular entertainment spot.

Crime 
St. Paul's Bay has the largest number of reported thefts in Malta, amounting to 423 out of 4,037 thefts, and the largest amount of domestic violence incidents, amounting to 93 out of 1,409.

Sports
 Sirens F.C. football club
 Sirens A.S.C. Waterpolo club
 Malta Young Sailors Club dinghy sailing club

Zones in St. Paul's Bay

Bajda Ridge
Buġibba
Burmarrad
Busewdien
Daħlet il-Fekruna
Erba' Mwieżeb
Għajn Astas
Għajn Rasul
Għar Għasfur
Ħotba ta' San Martin
Il-Ballut
Il-Ħamra
Il-Palma

Il-Wileġ
L-Imbordin
Mdawra
Mistra Bay (Qala l-Mistra)
Miżieb
Port Bur-Marrad
Pwales Beach (Ramla tal-Pwales)
Qawra
Qawra Point (Ras il-Qawra)
Rdum l-Abjad (White Cliffs)
Rdum Rxawn
Rdum Tal-Maħruq
Rxawn Point

Safsafa
San Martin
San Pawl Milqi
Simar
Tal-Arġentier
Tal-Basal
Ta' Ċampra
Tal-Fjuri
Ta' Garrum
Tal-Għażżelin
Tal-Qadi
Tal-Qarbuni
Ta' Rkuplu

Tal-Veċċja
Tax-Xama'
Ta' Xewka
Wardija
Wardija Heights
Wardija Ridge
Wied Bufula
Wied Qannotta
Wied Sardin
Wied tal-Mistra
Wied tal-Pwales
Xemxija
Xemxija Bay

Main roads

St. Paul's Bay
Dawret San Pawl (St Paul By-Pass)
Triq Għajn Tuffieħa (Golden Bay Road)
Triq Parades
Triq San Pawl (St Paul Street)
Triq il-Mosta

Buġibba
Dawret il-Gżejjer (Islet Promanade)
Triq il-Bajja (Bay Street)
Triq Bordino (Bordino Street)
Triq l-Erba' Mwieżeb (Erba' Mwiezeb Road)
Triq il-Korp tal-Pijunieri (Pioneer Corps Road)
Triq il-Kaħli
Triq il-Knisja (Church Street)
Triq il-Mosta (Mosta Road)
Triq il-Plajja ta' Bognor (Bognor Beach Street)
Triq ir-Rebbiegħa (Spring Street)
Triq Sir Luigi Preziosi (Sir Luigi Preziosi Street)
Triq Sant' Antnin (St Anthony Street)
Triq Toni Bajada (Toni Bajada Street)

Burmarrad
Triq Burmarrad (Burmarrad Road)
Triq il-Wardija (Wardija Road)
Triq il-Witja
Triq Toni Camilleri {Burmarrad Road to Mosta}

Qawra
Dawret il-Gżejjer (Islet Promenade)
Dawret il-Qawra (Qawra Promenade)
Triq Cassarino (Cassarino Street)
Triq Għawdex (Gozo Street)
Triq il-Ħalel (Waves Street)
Triq il-Wileġ
Triq J. F. Kennedy (J. F. Kennedy Street)
Triq is-Salina (Salina Road) or (Kennedy Drive)
Triq it-Trunċiera (Entrenchment Street)
Triq it-Turisti (Tourist Street)

Xemxija
Telgħa tal-Mistra (Mistra Hill)
Telgħa tax-Xemxija (Xemxija Hill)
Xatt il-Pwales (Pwales Strand)

Twin towns – sister cities

Saint Paul's Bay is twinned with:
 Chaum, France
 Agios Pavlos, Greece
 Oroslavje, Croatia

References

 
Towns in Malta
Local councils of Malta